WCKR (92.1 FM) is a radio station broadcasting a Top 40 (CHR) format. Licensed to Hornell, New York, United States, the station serves the Canisteo Valley area.  The station is currently owned by PMJ Communications, Inc., a company controlled by the estate of Kevin Doran, who owned the station (along with AM counterpart WLEA) from the early 1990s until his death in 2015.

For most of its history on air, WCKR was a country music station, a format it abandoned in May 2017 in favor of top 40. On February 1, 2020, WCKR changed their format from pop music to sports, branded as "92.1 The Team". The station acknowledged that the 2020 format flip was strictly financial, as they could no longer afford to pay royalties to play music. On August 14, 2020, amid widespread disruption of the sporting world in spring and summer 2020, WCKR relaunched the Fun 92.1 branding and its Top 40 format six months later.

The transmitter facilities are located on Tobes Hill, 1,978' amsl.

References

External links

CKR
Contemporary hit radio stations in the United States